The α900 (DSLR-A900) is a full-frame digital SLR camera, produced by Sony. An early design study of the camera was shown at PMA on 8 March 2007, and a newer prototype announced at PMA 2008 on 31 January 2008. Sony officially introduced the final camera on 9 September 2008 prior to photokina 2008. In October 2011, Sony Japan announced the camera's end of production.

The specifications include: 24.6-megapixel CMOS sensor, 5 frame/s burst mode, dual BIONZ processors, 100% viewfinder, 9-point AF with 10 assist points, inbuilt image sensor shift stabilization and intelligent preview.  It does not have video/movie recording.

Intelligent preview mode
This mode, first introduced on the DSLR-A900, allows the photographer to take a sample image at the current settings.  When this mode is enabled in the settings (default), then using the depth of field (DOF) preview button makes a preview image of the subject.  The display shows the image and its image histogram, but it is not stored on the memory card.  At that point, the photographer can accept current settings or simulate how the image (and histogram) would look with changes in aperture, shutter speed, dynamic range optimizer and white balance.  If the photographer prefers those new settings he simply continues to work to accept them.  Otherwise he can reject them by depressing the garbage can icon.  He can also compare the sample to the simulation by depressing the DISP button.

Predecessor to the DSLR-A850 

The DSLR-A900 requires a labour-intensive alignment procedure in the factory in order to provide a 100% scene view in the viewfinder.  In eliminating this costly procedure by masking the view to a slightly smaller area (98%) while also downspecifying the frame rate to 3 frames per second, the DSLR-A850 offers a camera with most of the benefits of the DSLR-A900 at a significant saving to the photographer.

External links

Reviews
 Sony A900  Preview Production model reviewed by Alphamountworld 
  by Imaging Resource.com
 Review by Digital Photography Review
 Review by South China Morning Post
 Full-length review by DigitalCameraInfo.com

News
 Sony A900 and Zeiss Lens Updates
 Sony Develops 35 mm full size CMOS Image Sensor with 24.81 Effective Megapixels
 Sony A900 ad reveals 24.6MP sensor

900
Cameras introduced in 2008
Full-frame DSLR cameras